Heritage Park may refer to:

 Heritage park, a type of open-air heritage park

Australia
 Brunswick Valley Heritage Park, Mullumbimby, New South Wales
 Heritage Park, Queensland

Canada
 Heritage Park Historical Village, Calgary, Alberta
 Heritage Park, Ontario

Ireland
 Bonane Heritage Park, Kenmare

United States of America (USA)
Alphabetical by state

 Heritage Park Zoological Sanctuary, Prescott, Arizona
 Heritage Park, Cerritos, California
 Heritage Park, Irvine, California
 Heritage Park (San Diego), California
 Heritage Park, Santa Fe Springs, California
 Heritage Park, Mableton, Georgia
 Heritage Park (Taylor, Michigan)
 Heritage Park (Colonie, New York)
 Heritage Park Mall, Midwest City, Oklahoma
 Heritage Park, Simpsonville, South Carolina
 Heritage Park (Morristown, Tennessee), now Fulton-Hill Park, on the site of the defunct Morristown College
 Heritage Park, Corpus Christi, Texas
 Heritage Park Plaza, Fort Worth, Texas
 Heritage Park, Camas, Washington
 Heritage Park (Olympia), Washington